The Skycity Stampede is a team in the New Zealand Ice Hockey League. It is based in Queenstown, New Zealand and was founded in 2005. The team was known as the Southern Stampede until 2016, when Skycity became the sides title sponsor.

Season by season results

Current roster
2012 NZIHL Season

References

External links
 
 NZ Ice hockey Federation
 Southern Stampede

New Zealand Ice Hockey League teams
Ice hockey teams in New Zealand
Sport in Queenstown, New Zealand
Trans-Tasman Champions League